Una Winifred Atwell (27 February or 27 April 1910 or 1914 – 28 February 1983) was a Trinidadian pianist who enjoyed great popularity in Britain and Australia from the 1950s with a series of boogie-woogie and ragtime hits, selling over 20 million records. She was the first black woman to have a number-one hit in the UK Singles Chart and is still the only female instrumentalist to do so.

Biography

Childhood
Atwell was born in Tunapuna in Trinidad and Tobago. She and her parents lived in Jubilee Street. Her family owned a pharmacy and she trained as a pharmacist herself and was expected to join the family business. She played the piano from a young age and achieved considerable popularity locally. She played for American servicemen at the Air Force base (which is now the main airport).

It was while playing at the Servicemen's Club at Piarco that someone bet her that she could not play something in the boogie-woogie style that was popular back home in the United States. She went away and wrote "Piarco Boogie", which was later renamed "Five Finger Boogie".

Leaving Trinidad
Atwell left Trinidad in the early 1940s and travelled to the United States to study with Alexander Borovsky. A newspaper clipping reveals that she played in a concert at The Town Hall in New York on May 10, 1945 as part of a presentation by the Altruss Opera Company starring Paul A. Smith, a well-known tenor.

It was announced on October 6, 1945 that "the noted West Indian pianist" had left for England where she will broadcast for the BBC on Tuesdays and Thursdays.  in London  she gained a place at the Royal Academy of Music where she completed her musical studies. She became the first female pianist to be awarded the academy's highest grading for musicianship.  To support her studies, she played rags at London clubs and theatres. These modest beginnings in variety would one day see her topping the bill at the London Palladium. She said later, "I starved in a garret to get onto concert stages."

Life in the UK
On October 21, 1946, Atwell appeared on BBC-TV in the "Stars In Your Eyes" show and this was quickly followed by several radio appearances on the Light Programme.  January 1947 saw her heading the bill of "Come to the Show" at the Empire Theatre, Belfast, where she was billed as "radio's most versatile pianist". Frequent radio appearances continued, including the well-known "Variety Bandbox" show. She appeared on the variety stages too, sometimes with another pianist called Donald Thorne.

Atwell attracted attention with an unscheduled appearance at the Casino Theatre, where she substituted for an ill star. She caught the eye of entrepreneur Bernard Delfont, who put her on a long-term contract in 1948. Atwell was championed by popular disc jockey Jack Jackson, who introduced her to Decca promotions manager Hugh Mendl. Mendl launched his career as a staff producer at Decca producing Atwell's recordings. She released a number of discs for Decca in 1951 that were well received. "Jezebel" sold well, however it was another disc that catapulted her to huge popularity in the UK. A complex arrangement called "Cross Hands Boogie" was released to show her virtuoso rhythmic technique, but it was the B-side, a 1900s tune written by George Botsford called "Black and White Rag", that was to become a radio standard.

"Black And White Rag" started a craze for her honky-tonk style of playing. The rag was originally performed on a concert grand for the occasion, but Atwell felt it did not sound right, and so got her husband to buy a honky tonk piano for 30 shillings, which would then be used for the released version of the song.

Atwell's husband, former stage comedian Lew Levisohn, was vital in shaping her career as a variety star. The two had met in 1946, and married soon after. They were inseparable up to Levisohn's death in Hong Kong in December 1977; they had no children. He had cannily made the choice, for stage purposes, of her playing first a concert grand, then a beaten-up old upright piano. The latter was purchased from a Battersea junk shop for 50 shillings. This became famous as "my other piano". It would later feature all over the world, from Las Vegas to the Sydney Opera House, travelling over half a million miles by air throughout Atwell's concert career. While contributing to a posthumous BBC radio appreciation of Atwell's career, Richard Stilgoe revealed that he was now the owner of the famous "other piano".

When Atwell first came to Britain, she initially earned only a few pounds a week. By the mid-1950s, this had shot up to over $10,000. By 1952, her popularity had spread internationally. Her hands were insured with Lloyd's of London for £40,000 (the policy stipulating that she was never to wash dishes). She signed a record contract with Decca, and her sales were soon 30,000 discs a week. She was by far the biggest selling pianist of her time. Her 1954 hit "Let's Have Another Party" was the first piano instrumental to reach number one in the UK Singles Chart.

She is the only holder of two gold and two silver discs for piano music in Britain, and was the first black artist in the UK to sell a million records. Millions of copies of her sheet music were sold, and she went on to record her best-known hits, including "Let's Have a Party", "Flirtation Waltz", "The Poor People of Paris" (which reached number one in the UK Singles Chart in 1956), "Britannia Rag" and "Jubilee Rag". Her signature "Black and White Rag" became famous again in the 1970s as the theme of the BBC snooker programme Pot Black, which also enjoyed great popularity in Australia when screened on the ABC network. It was during this period that she discovered Matt Monro and persuaded Decca to sign him.

Atwell's peak was the second half of the 1950s, during which her concerts drew standing room only crowds in Europe and Australasia. She played three Royal Variety Performances, appeared in every capital city in Europe, and played for over twenty million people. At a private party for Queen Elizabeth II, she was called back for an encore by the monarch herself, who requested "Roll Out the Barrel". She became a firm television favourite. She had her own series in Britain. The first of these was Bernard Delfont Presents The Winifred Atwell Show. It ran for ten episodes on the new ITV network from 21 April to 23 June 1956, and the BBC picked up the series the following year. On a third triumphal tour of Australia, she recorded her own Australian television series, screened in 1960–1961. Her career earned her a fortune, and would have extended further to the US but for issues of race. Her breakthrough appearance was to have been on The Ed Sullivan Show in 1956, but on arrival in America she was confronted with problems of selling the show in the south with a British-sounding black woman. The appearance was never recorded.

Life in Australia
In 1955, Atwell arrived in Australia and was greeted as an international celebrity. Her tour broke box-office records on the Tivoli circuit, bringing in £600,000 in box-office receipts. She was paid AUS$5,000 a week (the equivalent of around $50,000 today), making her the highest paid star from a Commonwealth country to visit Australia up to that time.

She toured Australia many times and took on Australian guitarist Jimmy Doyle as her musical director in the 1960s. In 1962 she made a nationwide tour of Britain, with "The Winifred Atwell Show". She was accompanied by the Cy Bevan Group, who were with her then current radio series "Pianorama". From Monday, 17 September 1962, for one week only, she gave twice nightly performances at the Brighton Hippodrome.  Also appearing with her on the same bill was Ronnie Carroll, a radio and television recording star. Her popularity in Australia led to her settling in Sydney in the 1970s. She became an Australian citizen two years before her death.

Keith Emerson noted her influence on his playing in an interview: "I've always been into ragtime. In England—and I'm sure Rick Wakeman would concur—we loved Winifred Atwell, a fantastic honky-tonk and ragtime player."

Atwell was also a skilled interpreter of classical music. On 1 and 2 December 1954, at London's Kingsway Hall, she made one of the first stereo classical recordings in the UK, with the London Philharmonic Orchestra conducted by Stanford Robinson, of a major repertoire work, the Piano Concerto in A minor, Op. 16, by Grieg. The two-channel version (engineered by Decca's Roy Wallace) appears not to have been released, but a transfer of the Decca LP (mono) LF1206 has been produced and issued by Pristine Audio as an available download.  Another Decca recording by Atwell is George Gershwin's Rhapsody in Blue with Ted Heath's band, which contained an arrangement in the slow section in the Glenn Miller style.

Later life
Atwell bought an apartment on the beach front in Flight Deck, an apartment complex in Collaroy in Sydney, as a jumping-off base for her worldwide performance commitments. She was a member of the Moby Dick Surf Club at Whale Beach where she performed regularly in support of the surf club. Enjoying the affection of the public, she was nevertheless keenly aware of prejudice and injustice and was outspoken about racism in Australia. She always donated her services in a charity concert on Sundays, the proceeds going to orphanages and needy children. She spoke out against the third world conditions endured by Australian Aborigines, which made headlines during an outback tour of the country in 1962. Dismissing racism as a factor in her own life, she said she felt she was "spoiled very much by the public." She left her estate to the Australian Guide Dogs for the Blind and a small amount to her goddaughter. However, a cousin of Lew Levisohn contested Atwell's will and is reported to have been granted $30,000 from her estate.

Atwell also created headlines in the 1960s with her dieting (slimming from sixteen to twelve stone on what would today be called a protein diet).

In 1978, she appeared on Australian TV's This Is Your Life.  She played her "other" piano at the end of the show with a few bars from "Black and White Rag" after the piano being in retirement for many years.

Though a dynamic stage personality, Atwell was, in person, a shy, retiring and soft-spoken woman of modesty. Eloquent and intellectual, she was well read and keenly interested in and informed about issues and current events. Voracious in her reading habits and a devotee of crosswords, she confessed to an inordinate love of mangoes, a dislike of new shoes, and a keen interest in televised cricket (she backed England). She was also a devout Catholic, who unpretentiously played the organ for her parish church.

Atwell often returned to her native Trinidad, and on one occasion she bought a house in Saint Augustine, a home she adored and later renamed Winvilla and which was later turned into the Pan Pipers Music School by one of her students, Louise McIntosh. In 1968 Atwell had recorded Ivory and Steel, an album of standards and classics, with the Pan Am Jet North Stars Steel Orchestra (director/arranger Anthony Williams), and supported musical scholarships in the West Indies. In the early 1980s, her sense of loss following her husband's death made her consider returning to Trinidad to live, but she found the weather too hot.

Atwell suffered a stroke in 1980. She officially retired on The Mike Walsh Show, then Australia's highest rating television variety programme, in 1981. She categorically stated that she would retire and not return as a public performer, and that she had had an excellent career. Her last TV performance was "Choo Choo Samba" followed with a medley of "Black and White Rag" and "Twelfth Street Rag". Her only non-private performances from this point were as an organist in her parish church at Narrabeen. In 1983, following an electrical fire that destroyed her Narrabeen home, she suffered a heart attack and died while staying with friends in Seaforth. She is buried beside husband Lew Levisohn in South Gundurimba Private Cemetery in northern New South Wales, just outside Lismore.

Awards
In 1969 she was awarded Trinidad and Tobago's national award, the Gold Hummingbird Medal, for her achievements in music.

Legacy
Elton John called Atwell one of his musical heroes.

In November 2020, a Nubian Jak Community Trust black plaque honouring Atwell was unveiled at the former site of a hair salon she owned in Chaucer Road, Brixton, south London.

Discography

Albums
Double Seven – Seven Rags Seven Boogies (1956), UK London Records
Chartbusters – Winifred Atwell, Music for Leisure

Singles
"Britannia Rag" (1952) – UK No. 5
"Coronation Rag" (1953) – UK No. 5
"Flirtation Waltz" (1953) – UK No. 10
"Let's Have a Party" (1953) – UK No. 2
"Rachmaninoff's 18th Variation on a Theme by Paganini (The Story of Three Loves)" (1954) – UK No. 9
"Let's Have Another Party" (1954) – UK No. 1
"Let's Have a Ding Dong" (1955) – UK No. 3
"The Poor People of Paris" (1956) – UK No. 1
"Port-Au-Prince" (1956) – UK No. 18
"Left Bank (C'Est A Hamburg)" (1956) – UK No. 14
"Make It a Party" (1956) – UK No. 7
"Let's Rock 'N' Roll" (1957) – UK No. 24
"Let's Have a Ball" (1957) – UK No. 4
"Moonlight Gambler" (1957) – US No. 16 (Music Vendor)
"Dawning" (1958) – US No. 95 (Music Vendor)
"The Summer of the Seventeenth Doll" (1959) – UK No. 24
"Piano Party" (1959) – UK No. 10
"Mexico City" (1966)
"Five Finger Boogie" and "Rhapsody Rag" (Philips PB 182)
"Moonlight Fiesta" and "18th Variation on a Theme of Paganini" (Philips PB 234)

Notes

References

External links
Winifred Atwell Site
45rpm discography
Winifred Atwell at the National Film and Sound Archive
Winifred Atwell Discography at Discoogle
 1953
 Australian TV 1981
Beyond the Rock – The continuing saga of Behind the Rock (Part 3), 2005 Memoirs of Leon Isackson, backing drummer from 1971 onwards

George McKay (2014), "Winifred Atwell and her other piano: 16 hit singles and a 'blanket of silence', sounding the limits of jazz".  Chapter in Jason Toynbee et al. eds. Black British Jazz (Ashgate)
 Interview with Colin Bailey, Winnie's drummer in the 1950s (2011, George McKay)

1910s births
1983 deaths
Year of birth uncertain
Date of birth uncertain
British women pianists
Boogie-woogie pianists
Ragtime pianists
Black British television personalities
20th-century Trinidad and Tobago musicians
Trinidad and Tobago emigrants to Australia
Trinidad and Tobago expatriates in the United Kingdom
Naturalised citizens of Australia
People from Tunapuna–Piarco
20th-century pianists
20th-century British musicians
Trinidad and Tobago Roman Catholics
Australian Roman Catholics
Recipients of the Hummingbird Medal
Trinidad and Tobago pharmacists
Women pharmacists
Decca Records artists
Philips Records artists
RCA Records artists
20th-century women pianists